Hurricane Karl was a large and powerful Cape Verde hurricane during the 2004 Atlantic hurricane season. It was the eleventh named storm, eighth hurricane, and the sixth and final major hurricane of the 2004 season. Karl formed on September 16, originating from a strong tropical wave that emerged off the coast of Africa. It rapidly intensified, becoming a major hurricane on two occasions. Karl peaked as a strong Category 4 hurricane on the Saffir-Simpson hurricane scale on September 21 with  winds. It weakened as it moved northward, becoming extratropical on September 24 in the north Atlantic before it was absorbed by another system on September 28. The extratropical storm affected the Faroe Islands, but no damage was reported there, nor were there any fatalities.

Meteorological history

Karl originated in a strong tropical wave that moved off the coast of Africa on September 13. That afternoon, the depression continued to rapidly organize and was upgraded to Tropical Storm Karl. Due to healthy outflow around an upper-level anticyclone over Karl and a favorable environment with the warmest sea surface temperatures of the year, rapid deepening began on the evening of September 17, with the storm developing a small eye and being upgraded to Hurricane Karl.

Late in the evening of September 18, Karl attained Category 3 status, becoming the sixth major hurricane of 2004. Early on September 20, the storm weakened slightly as a result of an eyewall replacement cycle, weakening back to a strong Category 3 hurricane. At this time Karl began to turn sharply northward into a weakness in the subtropical ridge.

After intensification stopped on September 20 due to the eyewall cycle and slightly increased wind shear, Karl quickly restrengthened that evening over very warm water, and early on September 21 reached its peak intensity as a powerful Category 4 hurricane with  winds and a minimum central pressure of 938 mbar. That morning, as Karl was moving northward, another eyewall replacement cycle began to take place and vertical shear increased, again weakening the storm temporarily. The trend continued into the evening, and the storm weakened to a Category 2 hurricane by early on September 22. The weakening trend slowed and eventually leveled off that afternoon with Karl remaining a Category 2 hurricane as the storm turned towards the north-northeast. Late that evening, Karl began to restrengthen once again as wind shear diminished. The intensification continued into the morning of September 23, as Karl became a major hurricane a second time, reaching a final peak of  winds.

Cooler waters and increased shear soon prevailed, however, and the storm quickly weakened, dropping to a Category 1 hurricane by late that evening as the low-level circulation became detached from the mid-level circulation due to the strong southwesterly vertical wind shear. Early on September 24, Karl continued its north-northeast track over the open north-central Atlantic and continued to gradually weaken. It started to come in contact with the baroclinic zone and began to lose tropical characteristics, while still a Category 1 hurricane. Karl became extratropical shortly afterward over the northern Atlantic at about 47°N, with its winds dropping below hurricane strength shortly thereafter. The extratropical storm made landfall on the Faroe Islands with hurricane-force wind gusts. As an extratropical low, the cyclone moved northeastward and eastward across the North Atlantic Ocean and the North Sea, eventually reaching Norway before it was absorbed into another extratropical low late on September 28.

Impact
No damages or deaths were reported, and no ships came directly into contact with Karl; the strongest winds reported were from the ship Rotterdam, which reported  sustained winds in the north Atlantic while Karl was a Category 1 storm in extratropical transition.

See also

List of Category 4 Atlantic hurricanes
Hurricane Kate (2003)
Hurricane Maria (2005)
Hurricane Katia (2011)
Hurricane Lorenzo (2019)

References

External links

 NHC's  on Hurricane Karl

Karl 2004
Karl 2004
Karl 2004
Karl 2004
Karl